Ribbleton railway station was on the Preston and Longridge Railway in Ribbleton, a suburb of Preston, Lancashire, England.

When the station opened in 1854 it was at first called Gammer Lane (which appears to be a misspelling of Gamull Lane, on which the station was located). Two years later, the line was bought by the Fleetwood, Preston and West Riding Junction Railway and the station was renamed Fulwood Station.

Between 1863 and 1866 there was another short-lived station called Ribbleton, closer to Preston. It was not until 1900 that Fulwood Station was finally renamed Ribbleton Station. The station closed to passengers, along with the line, in 1930.
 
The line through the station continued to be used for goods trains to and from Courtaulds Red Scar Works until 1980. After closure the Gamull Lane bridge over the line was removed. The route on either side is now a combined cycle path and footpath. The station building still stands, and was a private house with the former trackbed through its garden until 2021 when it was bought by Preston Trampower, intending to use it as their headquarters.

Notes

References 

 Biddle, G. (1989) The Railways Around Preston—A Historical Review, Scenes from the past, 6, Foxline Publishing, 
 Suggitt, G. (2003, revised 2004) Lost Railways of Lancashire, Countryside Books, Newbury, pp. 50, 51 & 55.
 Potter, T. (1993), Reflections on Preston, Sigma Leisure, Wilmslow, p. 46.
 Preston to Longridge Disused Railway, Lancashire County Council website, accessed 15 June 2007

External links 

 Preston Station Past and Present — page specifically covering the Longridge Line

Disused railway stations in Preston
Former Preston and Longridge Railway stations
Railway stations in Great Britain opened in 1854
Railway stations in Great Britain closed in 1930
Grade II listed buildings in Lancashire
Grade II listed railway stations